Jędrusik is a Polish surname. Notable people with the surname include:

 Kalina Jędrusik (1930–1991), Polish singer and actress
 Tomasz Jędrusik (born 1969), Polish athlete
 Wiesław Jędrusik (born 1945), Polish politician

Polish-language surnames